Mappus is a surname. Notable people with the surname include:
 Stefan Mappus (born 1966), German politician (CDU)
 Ted Mappus (1926-2022), American politician

Surnames of German origin